I Miss You, Hugs and Kisses (also known as Drop Dead, Dearest and Left for Dead) is a 1978 Canadian drama mystery film based on the Peter Demeter murder case. The film is one of the infamous "Video Nasties", and is the first film scored by Howard Shore.

Cast

References

External links 

 

1970s mystery films
Films scored by Howard Shore
Canadian mystery films
English-language Canadian films
1970s English-language films
1970s Canadian films